Brookside (once called Waterstreet) is a historic unincorporated community within Mendham Township in Morris County, New Jersey, United States. It is close to the Washington Valley Historic District in neighboring Morris Township.

The settlement appeared on maps as early as 1777. A portion of the Patriots' Path, the trail George Washington and his troops marched on, runs through Brookside's woods along the Whippany River. 
Brookside was noted as a postal village in 1882.  In 1883, the population was 187. The Brookside Post Office, which at one time was also a general store and gas station, is still the social hub of the village. Many residents stop there daily to collect their mail. In 1996, most of the village was listed on the National Register of Historic Places as the Brookside Historic District.

In the Forbes magazine 2009 ranking of the Most Expensive ZIP Codes in the United States, Brookside was ranked as the 10th most expensive in the country, with its median home sale price of $3,121,115.

Historic district

The Brookside Historic District is a historic district encompassing the village. The district was added to the National Register of Historic Places on February 16, 1996, for its significance in architecture, industry, and community development from 1780 to 1942. It includes 114 contributing buildings, 6 contributing structures, and 8 contributing sites.

Culture
The yearly "Brookside 4th of July" Parade, sponsored by the Community Club, has been a communal event since 1923. It includes floats made by community groups and families, a lawnmower brigade, fire departments and ambulance squads from all over the region, farm animals, a pooch parade, and both rock and marching bands. It starts at 9 am from the intersection of Dogwood Drive and Tingley Road, then down East Main Street to the Community Club Field where food, games, and activities for people of all ages await. 

The Annual Clam Bake, sponsored by the Brookside Engine Company #1, is also held at the Community Club Field on the second Saturday in September. Other events and programs are often offered by the Mendham Township Library, located on the 1st floor of the municipal building on West Main Street in Brookside. The library website and bulletin board in town hall usually contain a list of events and contact information to RSVP.

Demographics

As of the 2010 United States Census, the 07926 ZIP Code Tabulation Area for Brookside had a population of 120.

Education
Mendham Township Public Schools are located in Brookside.

Notable people

People who were born in, residents of, or otherwise closely associated with Brookside include:
 Peter Dinklage (born 1969), actor and film producer.
Alice Flaherty (born 1963), neurologist and writer.
 Morris Frank (born 1908), cofounder of The Seeing Eye, the first guide-dog school in the United States.
 Stewart G. Pollock (born 1933), Justice of the Supreme Court of New Jersey from 1979 to 1999.

See also
National Register of Historic Places listings in Morris County, New Jersey

References

External links
 

Mendham Township, New Jersey
Unincorporated communities in Morris County, New Jersey
Unincorporated communities in New Jersey
National Register of Historic Places in Morris County, New Jersey
Historic districts on the National Register of Historic Places in New Jersey
New Jersey Register of Historic Places